Hujiayuan Station is a Chinese station of Line 9 of the Tianjin Metro. It started operations on  March 28, 2004.

References

External links 

Railway stations in Tianjin
Railway stations in China opened in 2004
Tianjin Metro stations